A Thousand Sisters: The Heroic Airwomen of the Soviet Union in World War II  is a 2019 young adult non-fiction book by Elizabeth Wein.  It tells the story of the three female Soviet aircrew regiments organized by Marina Raskova in World War II, including the regiment of night bombers nicknamed the Night Witches. It was a finalist for the 2020 YALSA Award for Excellence in Nonfiction.

References

Books about World War II
2019 books
American non-fiction books
Balzer + Bray books